Espanto Jr. (born March 26, 1986) is a Mexican luchador enmascarado, or masked professional wrestler currently working for the Mexican professional wrestling promotion Consejo Mundial de Lucha Libre (CMLL) portraying a rudo ("bad guy") wrestling character. Espanto Jr.'s real name is not a matter of public record, as is often the case with masked wrestlers in Mexico where their private lives are kept a secret from the wrestling fans. He made his professional wrestling debut in 2001 at the age of only 15.

He is the son of the original Espanto Jr., Jesús Andrade Salas, and is a part of an extensive wrestling family that started with his grandfather Jose Andrade, better known as "El Moro". At least nine of his uncles are luchadors and his cousin Manuel Andrade, best known as La Sombra currently works for AEW. Espanto Jr. original worked under the ring name "Moro Jr." after his grandfather and later took the name "Hijo del Pentagón" after his father who portrayed the original Pentagón. While in CMLL he has participated in their annual Gran Alternativa 2013 and Gran Alternativa 2014 tournaments as well as the 2016 La Copa Junior tournament.

Personal life
Espanto Jr. was born on March 28, 1986, Gómez Palacio, Durango, Mexico. In Lucha libre it is traditional to preserve the privacy of any enmascarado ("Masked wrestler") unless they are unmasked. Due to this secrecy Espanto Jr.'s birth name is not common knowledge and traditionally not something Mexican news sources would report on. It has been revealed that his paternal last name is "Andrade" as he has publicly stated that he is the son of professional wrestler Jesús Andrade Salas, who was the first wrestler to use the ring name Espanto Jr. Jesús Andrade also worked as Pentagón and Santo Negro during his career.

He is the grandson of El Moro (Spanish for "The Moor") and has at least nine uncles that are or were involved with professional wrestling over the years. The most well known second-generation Andrade brother are three that worked as Lo Gemelos del Ring ("The Gems of the Ring") – Brilliante (Jose Andrade Salasa), Zafiro (Who was also the original Pentagoncito) and Diamante (Sergio Andrade Salas, also known as "Moro III"). Other Andrade brothers have played the part of Zafiro (Juan Andrade Salas, now known as "Espirtu Magico") and Diamante (César Andrade Salas, better known as Kevin, Radioactivo, El Pollo and El Pollo Asesino). Sergi Andrade Salas is another uncle who at one point was a professional wrestler, having briefly worked as "Hijo del Espectro", but it is unclear if he is still wrestling or retired. Manuel Andrade worked for a while as El Fúnebre. In interviews the Andrade family has indicated that at least two other Andrade brothers are involved with wrestling, but not clearly identified who they were. His cousin Manuel Alfonso Andrade Oropeza, son of Jose Andrade, worked under the ring name La Sombra from 2007 until 2015.

Growing up as part of a lucha libre family the future Espanto Jr. decided he wanted to follow in the footsteps of his father and grandfather at an early age. In a 2010 interview he recalled how he would be in the front row watching his father wrestle from the time he could walk. In 1996 his father suffered an injury during a match and was briefly clinically dead while in the ring until he was revived. While the injury left a big impression on the then-10 year old he later accepted that it was an accident and tried not to think about it, but did comment that his mother still worried about him every time he competed.

Professional wrestling career
Espanto Jr. made his debut in October or November 2001, wearing a mask and using the ring name "El Moro Jr." a tribute to his grandfather. Initially, he worked in the Andrade family owned Arena Olimpico Laguna in Gómez Palacio, Durango, Mexico while still developing his wrestling skills. Early on in his career Moro Jr. teamed up with Espanto V on multiple occasions, a name that would later become more significant in his career. In 2005 he was one of ten wrestlers participating in the first ever Copa Moro in honor of his grandfather. Moro Jr. teamed up with Oso Negro, Latino Junior, Psycho and his uncle Zafiroto taking on the team of Brillante Junior, Cadete de la Atlántida I, Cadete de la Atlántida II, Espacial and Tigre Chong in an elimination match. In 2008 Moro Jr. became involved in a storyline feud with local Exótico wrestler Sexy Psicis. After several matches between the two they both agreed to put their hair on the line in a Lucha de Apuestas, or bet match, while Moro Jr. was masked for this specific match he put his hair on the line. Sexy Psicis won the match, forcing Moro Jr. to remove his mask enough to have his hair shaved off afterwards as per the stipulations. The match between the two was described as "the best match of the night" by the El Siglo del Torreon newspaper. After the match Moro Jr. put out a challenge against Sexy Psicis where he would put his mask on the line. In early 2009 Moro Jr. worked a four-way feud against Kato Kung Lee Jr., Galaxy and Radioactivo, a feud that led to a four-way liLucha de Apuestas match where all four wrestlers put their masks on the line. On February 28 Moro Jr. pinned Radioactivo, winning his first Lucha de Apuestas match. After the match Radioactivo was unmasked and revealed that he was César Andrade Salas, Moro Jr.'s uncle.

In 2009 Moro Jr. changed his ring character, adopting the name "El Hijo del Pentagón", playing off the fact that his father portrayed the original Pentagón late in his career. He remain primarily in Gómez Palacio, Durango out of the national spotlight.

Consejo Mundia de Lucha Libre (2012–present)
In 2012 Consejo Mundial de Lucha Libre (CMLL) introduced their Generacion 2012, ("Generation 2012"), essentially the 2012 "graduating class" from CMLL's wrestling school. The group included Oro Jr. Herodes Jr., Taurus, Genesis, Guerrero Negro Jr. and Akuma as well as Espanto Jr. who wore the distinctive black and white mask of the Los Espantos team. Espanto Jr. was later revealed to be the son of the original Espanto Jr., who had used the ring name from 1984 until 1994. In the weeks and months following the introduction of Generacion 2012 wrestler, "Hijo del Espanto" (Literally "the Son of Espanto") publicly stated that he was the rightful holder of the rights to the Espanto name, given to him by the only remaining, living member of the original Los Espantos, Espanto II. Hijo del Espanto demanded that Espanto Jr. changed his name, but neither the wrestler nor CMLL ever responded to the request. CMLL never commented on the claim of El Hijo del Espanto, nor did they modify Espanto Jr.'s name or mask design. Previously El Hijo del Espanto had successfully prevented AAA from promoting a different team as "Los Hijos del Espanto", who in fact were uncles of Espanto Jr., Sergio and César Andrade Salas. While the claim was successful in 2001, the Mexico City boxing and wrestling commission did not block CMLL's usage of the name "Espanto Jr." as CMLL continued to promote Espanto Jr. even after the claim by El Hijo del Espanto.

Prior to his in-ring debut sports website MedioTiempo had described Espanto Jr. of having "a good look and better wrestling skills" based on what they had seen of him before becoming Espanto Jr. Espanto Jr. made his in-ring debut for CMLL on September 18, 2012 on an Arena Mexico show where he teamed up with fellow Generacion 2012 member Herodoes Jr., losing his debut match to Bengala and Oro Jr. After the match a Super Lchas Magazine writer stated that Espanto Jr. had an "Amargo debut", or "Bitter debut" in the team's loss Espanto Jr.'s first high level exposure came in February 2013 where he was one of 20 participants in the 2013 Torneo Sangre Nueva ("New Blood Tournament"). This was his first significant tournament in CMLL and in a tournament specifically designed to bring attention to the young, low-ranked wrestlers of the promotion. He participated in qualifying block A that wrestled on February 26, 2013 where he was one of 10 wrestlers in the torneo cibernetico, multi-man elimination match alongside Akuma, Camaleón, Cholo, Herodes Jr., Hombre Bala Jr., Höruz, Stigma, Soberano Jr. and Boby Zavala. He was eliminated by Hombre Bala Jr. as the fifth man eliminated overall, he did not eliminate anyone during the match. Block winner Soberano Jr. would end up winning the entire tournament.

In late March, 2013 Espanto Jr. was announced as one of the Novatos, or rookies, in the 2013 Torneo Gran Alternativa, or "Great Alternative tournament". The Gran Alternativa paired a rookie with an experienced wrestler for a tag team tournament, which similarly to the Torneo Sangre Nueva was designed to showcase various CMLL rookies. Espanto Jr. was teamed up with veteran wrestler Mr. Niebla and competed in Block B that took place on the April 19, 2013 Super Viernes show. The team defeated rookie Camaleón and veteran Brazo de Plata in the first round, but lost to eventual tournament winners, rookie Bobby Zavala and veteran Rey Escorpión in the second round to be eliminated from the tournament. The following year Espanto Jr. once again competed in that year's Gran Alternativa tournament, this time teaming up with veteran Mephisto for the tournament. The team lost to rookie Soberano Jr. and veteran Volador Jr. in the first round of the tournament held on March 31, 2014.

On January 5, 2016 Espanto Jr. was one of sixteen wrestlers competing in CMLL's annual La Copa Junior tournament. The La Copa Junior tournament celebrated the fact that Lucha libre is a family business by showcasing second and third-generation wrestlers only. Espanto Jr. competed in Block B of the tournament along with fellow second- or third-generation wrestlers Canelo Casas, Esfinge, The Panther, Sansón, Soberano Jr., Super Halcón Jr. and Tiger. Espanto Jr. was the second man eliminated, pinned by Super Halcón Jr. The block was won by Esfinge who would go on to win the entire tournament.

Championships and accomplishments
Mexican independent circuit
Laguna Extreme Championship (1 time)

Luchas de Apuestas record

Footnotes

References

1986 births
Mexican male professional wrestlers
Living people
Masked wrestlers
Unidentified wrestlers
Professional wrestlers from Durango
People from Gómez Palacio, Durango